The list of ship launches in 1690 includes a chronological list of some ships launched in 1690.


References

1690
Ship launches